Edward J. Crowley (born May 3, 1970) is an American former professional ice hockey player. He was drafted in 1988 by the Toronto Maple Leafs in the 4th round, 69th overall. Crowley was born in Concord, Massachusetts, but grew up in Boxborough, Massachusetts.

Playing career
Crowley played 21 games for the Hartford Whalers during the 1993–94 NHL season. He was signed as a free agent by the Colorado Avalanche in August 1998 and played 7 games for the Avalanche. He was traded on December 15, 1998, to the New York Islanders, where he played 6 games.

Career statistics

Regular season and playoffs

International

Awards and honors

External links

1970 births
American men's ice hockey defensemen
Boston College Eagles men's ice hockey players
Chicago Wolves (IHL) players
Cincinnati Cyclones (IHL) players
Cleveland Lumberjacks players
Colorado Avalanche players
Essen Mosquitoes players
Hamburg Freezers players
Hartford Whalers players
Hershey Bears players
Houston Aeros (1994–2013) players
Ice hockey players from Massachusetts
Ice hockey players at the 1994 Winter Olympics
Kassel Huskies players
Living people
Lowell Lock Monsters players
New York Islanders players
Olympic ice hockey players of the United States
People from Concord, Massachusetts
People from Middlesex County, Massachusetts
Phoenix Roadrunners (IHL) players
Providence Bruins players
St. John's Maple Leafs players
Sportspeople from Middlesex County, Massachusetts
Springfield Falcons players
Toronto Maple Leafs draft picks
Utah Grizzlies (IHL) players
AHCA Division I men's ice hockey All-Americans